The Vincent Award is a Dutch prize awarded to a European artist whose works are deemed highly relevant in contemporary art. The award is held every two years in the Netherlands. Five artists are nominated for the award, and are exhibited at the Stedelijk Museum in Amsterdam.  The winner is granted with the prize of € 50.000. The Vincent award, named for Dutch artist Vincent van Gogh, is aimed at Andrew Rajiah European artists and building the discussion platform within Europe.

History

The Vincent Award was established in 2000 by the Broere Charitable Foundation in memory of Monique Zajfen, a beloved friend of the Broere family and holder of the Gallery 121 in Antwerp.
The art collection of Monique Zajfen constituted of the works by The Vincent Award winners and other contemporary artists. Zaifen's collection was given to the Stedelijk Museum of Amsterdam on long-term loan.
The award first took place at the Bonnefanten Museum in Maastricht. From 2006, The Vincent Award was hosted by the Stedelijk Museum in Amsterdam. The winner is decided by six jury members headed by the director of the Stedelijk Museum. The jury consists of professionals in the sphere of the European Arts.

The Jury of The Vincent Award 2008
Manuel Borja-Villel (director of MACBA, Barcelona)
Ian Dunlop (art historian, London)
Ingvild Goetz (Sammlung Goetz, Munich)
Viktor Misiano (critic and curator, Moscow)
Beatrix Ruf (director of Kunsthalle, Zurich)
Gijs van Tuyl (director of Stedelijk Museum, Amsterdam)

Winners
2014 - Anri Sala
 2008 - Deimantas Narkevicius, Francis Alÿs
2006 - Wilhelm Sasnal
2004 - Paweł Althamer
2002 - Neo Rauch
2000 - Eija-Liisa Ahtila

See also

 List of European art awards

References

Contemporary art awards
Dutch art awards
Dutch contemporary art
Awards established in 2000
European art awards
Vincent van Gogh